The 1956–57 season was the 73rd football season in which Dumbarton competed at a Scottish national level, entering the Scottish Football League, the Scottish Cup and the Scottish League Cup.  In addition Dumbarton competed in the Stirlingshire Cup.

Scottish League

By coming so close to promotion the previous season, confidence was high to mount a serious challenge on the Division 2 title. However, despite breaking the 100 goals scored in a league season for the first time, the 70 against was never going to be 'championship material' and only a 9th place was achieved with 38 points, 26 behind runaway winners Clyde.

Scottish Cup

In the Cup, Dumbarton dispatched two Division 1 clubs en route to the quarter finals, where Raith Rovers were to prove too strong.

Scottish League Cup

Dumbarton failed to qualify from their section in the League Cup, although it was their poor home performances which were to count against them this season.

Stirlingshire Cup
With an aggregate win over Alloa Athletic in the final, the county cup returned to Dumbarton for the second time.

Friendlies

Player statistics

|}

Source:

Transfers
Amongst those players joining and leaving the club were the following:

Players in

Players out 

Source:

Reserve team
Dumbarton played a 'reserve' team in the Alliance League, which was set up for Division 2 sides.  The season was split into two 'series' - with Dumbarton winning the First Series (with 6 wins and 2 draws from 10 games) and finishing as runners up in the Second (with 6 wins and 3 draws from 12 games).

References

Dumbarton F.C. seasons
Scottish football clubs 1956–57 season